is the 33rd single by Japanese singer Yōko Oginome. Written by Rei Nakanishi and Kunihiko Suzuki, the single was released on November 23, 1994, by Victor Entertainment.

Background and release
The song was originally recorded by Jun Mayuzumi in 1967. Nakanishi wrote the song based on his experience as a refugee from Manchukuo during World War II.

"Koi no Hallelujah" peaked at No. 76 on Oricon's singles chart and sold over 4,000 copies.

Track listing

Charts

References

External links

1994 singles
Yōko Oginome songs
Japanese-language songs
Victor Entertainment singles